Philipp Ludwig of Neuburg (2 October 1547 – 22 August 1614) was Count Palatine of Neuburg from 1569 until 1614.

Life
Philipp Ludwig was born in Zweibrücken in 1547 as the eldest son of Wolfgang, Count Palatine of Zweibrücken. After his father's death in 1569, his lands were partitioned between Philipp Ludwig and his four brothers - Philipp Ludwig received the Duchy of Neuburg. He married Anna (1552–1632), daughter of Duke Wilhelm IV "the Rich" of Jülich-Cleves-Berg, in 1574 and used the marriage as the basis of his claim to inherit the duchies in the succession controversy against the Elector of Brandenburg after William IV's only son, John William, died without heirs. In 1613 Philip Louis's eldest son, Wolfgang Wilhelm, converted to Catholicism and gained the support of Spain and the Catholic League, while Brandenburg received the support of the Netherlands. 

The conversion of his son and heir was very difficult for the staunchly Lutheran Philipp Ludwig. He died in Neuburg in 1614 and was buried in Lauingen, succeeded by his son Wolfgang Wilhelm as Count Palatine of Neuburg. By the Treaty of Xanten in 1614 the duchies were partitioned following the War of the Jülich Succession, with Wolfgang Wilhelm receiving the Duchies of Jülich and Berg.

Family
Philipp Ludwig married Anna of Cleves (1 March 1552 – 6 October 1632), daughter of Wilhelm, Duke of Jülich-Cleves-Berg on 27 September 1574 and had the following children:
Countess Palatine Anna Maria of Neuburg (18 August 1575 – 11 February 1643), married on September 9, 1591 to Friedrich Wilhelm I, Duke of Saxe-Weimar.
Dorothea Sabine (13 October 1576 – 12 December 1598). Her burial gown is one of the few complete women's garments from the sixteenth century to have survived and is preserved in the Bayerisches National Museum in Munich.
Wolfgang Wilhelm, Count Palatine of Neuburg (25 October 1578 – 20 March 1653)
Otto Henry (28 October 1580 – 2 March 1581)
Augustus, Count Palatine of Sulzbach (2 October 1582 – 14 August 1632)
Amalia Hedwig (24 December 1584 – 15 August 1607)
Johann Friedrich, Count Palatine of Sulzbach-Hilpoltstein (23 August 1587 – 19 October 1644)
Sophie Barbara (3 April 1590 – 21 December 1591)

Ancestors

Notes

House of Wittelsbach
Counts Palatine of Sulzbach
Counts Palatine of Neuburg
House of Palatinate-Zweibrücken
1547 births
1614 deaths
Burials in Bavaria